The Huntaway (also known as the New Zealand Huntaway) is a large, strongly-built breed of dog used for general sheep-herding tasks in New Zealand, where they originate. They were bred to use their loud, deep bark to drive sheep.

The breed dates from the late-19th century, and is distinguished only on working ability. There is no prescribed appearance or lineage, but they are usually black-and-tan coloured. Only dogs that win at trials may be registered by the New Zealand Sheep Dog Trial Association in their studbook.

Description

Their coats can vary in colour; colours include black and tan (usually) with some white or brindle. Their coats can also come in different textures; they can be smooth, rough, or grizzly and they are generally floppy eared.

They are required to have great intelligence, agility and stamina for days of working on steep, rough country over large distances, driving very large mobs of sheep. Their bark is deep and repeating, usually with a short pause between barks, which allows the barking to be sustained for very long periods.

History

The huntaway was developed as a breed in response to farming conditions found in the New Zealand high country. The vast pastoral runs or "stations", such as those in the high country of the South Island, required teams of dogs who could work mustering for days on end, covering great distances on rough steep country. High country stations typically cover many thousands of hectares, and were often unfenced. British sheepdogs used by early New Zealand farmers mostly worked sheep silently, but occasionally a dog would use its bark to herd sheep. This characteristic was liked by some farmers, especially for driving sheep on rough, steep hill country where a dog may disappear from view, making a dog that drives stock by sight less useful. Collies and other working sheepdogs with the barking trait would have been crossed with any other breed that had other desirable traits, including size, stamina and a steady barking ability, as these are the traits that differentiate the huntaway from the heading dog today, but the exact lineage is not known.

The earliest references to huntaways are in the late 19th century. A sheepdog trial with a specific class for huntaways was advertised in the Upper Waitaki in 1870. "Wanted" advertisements for "huntaway sheepdogs" were in the Otago Daily Times newspaper in 1884, heading and huntaway collies were advertised for sale in 1885.
The huntaway was further developed as a separate breed from the heading dog during the 20th century.

Breed recognition
As of August 2013 the Huntaway breed was recognised by the New Zealand Kennel Club (NZKC). This is the first recognition of a dog breed of New Zealand origin.  There is an NZKC standard for the Huntaway breed, but the standard notes:
It is the opinion of the New Zealand Sheepdog Trial Association that a Huntaway should never be shown, due to the large variance in colour, type and size and the inability to prove in a show ring their core (and only) task of working stock. It is the opinion of the New Zealand Sheepdog Trial Association that a New Zealand Huntaway should not be kept solely as a pet. No changes to the official breed standard of the New Zealand Huntaway will be made without consultation with the New Zealand Sheepdog Trial Association.

General information
Huntaways generally live to around 12 to 14 years of age. They are generally very healthy, but some inheritable diseases have been identified. They are intelligent, friendly, very energetic, active dogs that require a lot of exercise. They have been bred to muster in the hills and mountains of New Zealand where it is difficult to walk or ride, so worded commands and whistles are used to communicate commands to these dogs when they are at a distance. They are well known for being a noisy dog, especially when working. There can be variation both in appearance but also in nature and abilities depending on the bloodline, some dogs being more suited to large station work which requires them to eagerly run and give noise all day, some being a more laid back and "handy" dog with an instinct to head stock off and use noise only when necessary while still being larger and more powerful than most herding dogs.

They are the second most common breed of dog in New Zealand, after Labrador Retrievers. They are becoming increasingly popular in other countries with a New Zealand Huntaway Club started in Japan and huntaways being bred and used in Australia for work and yard dog trials.

Hunterville in the North Island of New Zealand is known for its statue of a Huntaway.

See also
 Dogs portal
 List of dog breeds

References

External links
 General Huntaway Information
 Huntaway Club UK

Herding dogs
Dog breeds originating in New Zealand